Pavlo Oliinyk (born 1989) is a Ukrainian freestyle wrestler currently representing Hungary, who won the gold medal at the 2013 European Wrestling Championships defeating Kamil Skaskiewicz of Poland 1–0, 4–0.

References

1989 births
Living people
Ukrainian male sport wrestlers
World Wrestling Championships medalists
Universiade medalists in wrestling
Hungarian male sport wrestlers
Universiade silver medalists for Ukraine
European Wrestling Championships medalists
Medalists at the 2013 Summer Universiade
Sportspeople from Khmelnytskyi, Ukraine
21st-century Ukrainian people